This is a list of foreign films shot in Iceland.

List

References

Iceland